Fantastyka (est 1982, in 1990 renamed Nowa Fantastyka)  is a Polish speculative fiction monthly fantasy and science fiction magazine.

History
It became known as one of few magazines to publish both foreign and Polish short stories, as well as full-length novels in instalments. Between 1990 and 1992 its editor-in-chief was Lech Jęczmyk, followed by Maciej Parowski and Arkadiusz Nakoniecznik. In March 2006 Paweł Matuszek took over.

Andrzej Sapkowski published his first short story about The Witcher in the magazine - a debut that led to the publishing success of The Witcher saga.

Today Fantastyka is dedicated predominantly to short stories, but also to articles on modern science, film and book reviews and comic pages. In addition, it brings fandom and convention news.

Apart from Nowa Fantastyka, there have been several periodical variations of the title:
 Mała Fantastyka (1987–1989) - an sf/fantasy quarterly for children
 Komiks-Fantastyka (1980s-1991) - comic books, in 1991 changed the name to Komiks
 Nowa Fantastyka - Wydanie specjalne (since 2003) - a quarterly with longer stories and novels
 Czas Fantastyki - (2004-2015) - a bimonthly with literary criticism, essays and prose

Fantastyka featured stories by Philip K. Dick, J. R. R. Tolkien, Anthony Burgess, Orson Scott Card, Kir Bulychov, and many other acclaimed writers. It was there that most of modern Polish sf/fantasy writers made their debut. Among them are Jacek Dukaj, Andrzej Sapkowski, Rafał A. Ziemkiewicz and Konrad T. Lewandowski. Finally, on the middle pages that used to be devoted to art, Fantastyka featured many renowned artists, including Enki Bilal, Wojciech Siudmak, Zdzisław Beksiński, Jacek Yerka and Jerzy Skarżyński. The comic series Lil & Put (by Maciej Kur and Piotr Bednarczyk) are currently published in the magazine, with satirical take on fantasy adventures.

See also

 Fenix, another Polish SF magazine
 Science fiction magazine
 Fantasy fiction magazine
 Horror fiction magazine
List of literary magazines

External links
fantastyka.pl

1982 establishments in Poland
Literary magazines published in Poland
Magazines established in 1982
Magazines published in Warsaw
Polish-language magazines
Polish science fiction
Recipients of the Silver Medal for Merit to Culture – Gloria Artis
Science fiction magazines
Science fiction magazines established in the 1980s